The Five Man Electrical Band (known as The Staccatos from 1963 to 1968) is a Canadian rock band from Ottawa, Ontario. They had many hits in Canada, including the top 10 entries "Half Past Midnight" (1967) (as The Staccatos), "Absolutely Right" (1971) and "I'm a Stranger Here" (1972). Internationally, they are best known for their 1971 hit single "Signs".

History

Initial success as The Staccatos (1963–1968) 
The band The Staccatos was formed in Ottawa in 1963.  It initially included singer Dean Hagopian, guitarist Vern Craig, bass player Brian Rading and singer/drummer Rick Bell (born Rick Belanger).  Hagopian left after about a year, and was replaced by vocalist and guitarist Les Emmerson, who would become the band's prime songwriter, while Bell and Emmerson split lead vocal duties.

The Staccatos made their debut as a recording act in 1965, with their early singles being written by Craig and Emmerson.  After releasing a non-charting single on a small independent label, the group signed to Capitol Records of Canada, and their second single, "Small Town Girl", made it into the Canadian top 20.  Several follow-ups also cracked the top 40, and The Staccatos were rising stars in their native country.  Their debut album, Initially, came out in 1966, and featured their hits to that point as well as several new recordings.

In the summer of 1966, Mike Bell (Rick's brother) joined the group as a second drummer and third vocalist.  Shortly thereafter, the group had their biggest hit to date with "Half Past Midnight", which rose to No. 8 on the Canadian charts. It was the second Staccatos single written solely by Emmerson, who by this point was writing most of the band's original material.  Also in 1968, The Staccatos issued a joint album with The Guess Who?, each band taking up one side of the LP.

The Staccatos follow-ups to "Half Past Midnight" did not meet with as much success in Canada. In the US, the situation was worse – the band's singles (released by Capitol and Tower) failed to chart at all.  Looking for a new direction, at the end of 1968, Ted Gerow was added to the line-up on keyboards, and shortly thereafter, Vern Craig left.  Around the same time, while recording their second full album, the band was prompted to change their name by producer Nick Venet's comment that the name The Staccatos sounded "dated".  After discussing various possibilities, bassist Rading seized upon a song Emmerson had written called "Five Man Electrical Band", claiming it's exactly what the group was.  The band's name was duly changed: Five Man Electrical Band released their self-titled album in early 1969.

Rebirth as Five Man Electrical Band (1969–1975) 
The group's new single "It Never Rains On Maple Lane" with B side "Private Train" was a mild success in Canada; the A-side appeared at No. 67 on the charts, but after two weeks on the charts the single was flipped over and B-side "Private Train" made it into the top 40, peaking at No. 37.  The album, meanwhile, contained a mixture of new material and older recordings originally released under the Staccatos name (including "Half Past Midnight") and was similarly successful in Canada.  Follow-up singles failed to chart.  At the end of 1969, the band ended their relationship with Capitol and signed with MGM Records.

The band's first two singles on MGM (released in 1970) both charted in the mid-50s in Canada.  The group's 1970 album Good-byes and Butterflies created a minor controversy with a front cover picture that featured a marijuana plant; the album was withdrawn and subsequently reissued with a new cover.

In 1971, the band had their first international success when their label reissued the second MGM single "Hello Melinda, Goodbye/Signs", originally recorded in Los Angeles, with the sides reversed. Disc jockeys and the public immediately took to "Signs" (written by Les Emmerson); it reached No. 4 in Canada, No. 3 on the US Billboard Hot 100, and went to No. 1 in Australia for nearly two months. It sold over one million copies, and was awarded a gold disc by the R.I.A.A. in August 1971.

In the next few years a number of charting singles were released: "Absolutely Right", "Money Back Guarantee", "Werewolf", "I'm A Stranger Here", and a few others, all written by Emmerson.  Outside of Canada, most were minor hits, but the band continued with a steady flow of releases and concert dates.  In 1972, the band issued Coming Of Age, their third album as Five Man Electrical Band.  Emmerson, who was more interested in recording in the studio than in playing live, also established a parallel solo career in 1972.

Mike Bell, now going by his birth name of Michael Belanger, left the group partway through the recording of their 1973 album Sweet Paradise, and bassist Brian Rading left just as the album was being finished.  The album produced several hit singles, including "I'm A Stranger Here", their highest-ever charting hit in Canada.  Emmerson, Gerow and Rick Belanger attempted to keep things going with new players for a time, producing singles in 1974 and '75, with minimal chart success outside of Canada.

Rick Belanger left the group in 1974, leaving Emmerson and Gerow as the only remaining permanent members of the ostensibly "Five Man" band.  Shortly thereafter, when 1975's "Johnny Get A Gun" peaked at a lowly No. 69 in Canada, Emmerson and Gerow decided to disband the Five Man Electrical Band.

Reunions
In 1986, Emmerson reformed the band for a series of concert and festival appearances, and continued to tour with them over the following decades.  From 1986 through about 2019, the band typically played a few shows a year as a sextet, usually consisting of Les Emmerson (guitar, lead vocals), Ted Gerow (keyboards), Brian Sim (lead guitar), Rick Smithers (bass), Steve Hollingworth (drums, vocals) and Mike Belanger (drums, vocals).

Emmerson also retained the rights to the band's recordings, and licensed several best-of compilations on CD.

Tesla scored a hit with a cover of the song "Signs" on their album Five Man Acoustical Jam in the 1990s. In 2005, Fatboy Slim released a single called "Don't Let the Man Get You Down", based mostly off a looped sample from "Signs" – specifically the opening line, "And the sign said long haired freaky people need not apply."

Brian Rading, bassist and founding member, died of cancer, age 69, on 8 June 2016 at his home in Hull, Quebec.

Les Emmerson died at his home in Ottawa at age 77 on 10 December 2021 of COVID-19 after suffering from several other health issues that weakened his resistance to the virus, according to his family.

Lineups 
Ted Gerow – keyboards
Brian Rading – bass
Vern Craig – vocals, guitar
Rick 'Bell' Belanger – drums
Les Emmerson – vocals, guitar
Mike 'Bell' Belanger – 2nd drums

Discography

Studio albums

as The Staccatos 
 1966 – Initially
 1968 – A Wild Pair (split album: one side by The Guess Who, the other by The Staccatos)

as Five Man Electrical Band 

 1969 – Five Man Electrical Band (includes several tracks originally issued on 7" singles as by The Staccatos in 1967/68)
 1970 – Good-byes and Butterflies (#52 Canada) (#148 US Billboard)
 1972 – Coming of Age (#49 Canada) (#199 US Billboard)
 1973 – Sweet Paradise (#66 Canada)

Compilation albums 
 1975 – The Power of the Five Man Electrical Band: Their Greatest Hits
 1995 – Absolutely Right: The Best of Five Man Electrical Band
 2008 – Half Past Midnight: The Staccatos and Beyond (CD release of 1969 Capitol LP, Five Man Electrical Band, plus numerous Staccatos singles.)
 2009 – The Staccatos – Five Man Electrical Band: First Sparks The Anthology (1964–1969) (2-CD Release of all the Staccatos singles, and all Five Man Electrical Band Capitol singles, all tracks from the two Capitol albums; the pre-Capitol Allied Records single; five tracks from the A Wild Pair album; and three songs never previously released.

Singles

as The Staccatos

as Five Man Electrical Band

Notes

References

External links 
 
 Five Man Electrical Band on Facebook
 
 
 
 Entry at canadianbands.com

Musical groups established in 1969
Musical groups from Ottawa
Canadian psychedelic rock music groups
1969 establishments in Ontario
Capitol Records artists
MGM Records artists
Musical groups disestablished in 1975